Bo Engdahl is a Swedish ski-orienteering competitor. He competed at the  1990 World Ski Orienteering Championships in Skellefteå, and won a gold medal in the relay for Sweden, together with Jonas Engdahl, Stig Mattsson and Anders Björkman. He placed overall second in the World Cup in Ski Orienteering in the 1991 season.

References

Swedish orienteers
Male orienteers
Ski-orienteers
Year of birth missing (living people)
Living people
20th-century Swedish people